August Borchard (4 July 1864, Lemgo – 19 February 1940, Berlin) was a German physician and surgeon.

He studied medicine at the Universities of Freiburg, Munich, Würzburg and Jena, receiving his doctorate at the latter institution in 1888 with a thesis on carcinomas of the antrum of Highmore, Ueber Carcinome der Highmorshöhle. Afterwards, he worked as an assistant in the pathological institute at Marburg and as a physician in the surgical clinic at the University of Königsberg. In 1895, he was a senior physician in the surgical department at the Diakonissenhaus in Posen. He later moved to Berlin, where he attained a professorship in 1908.

In 1930, he became a member of the Academy of Sciences Leopoldina. In 1934/35, he served as president of the Deutschen Gesellschaft für Unfallchirurgie (German Association for Trauma Surgery). He was co-publisher and editor of the Archivs für klinische Chirurgie and the Zentralblatts für Chirurgie.

Selected works 
 Über Lungenschüsse, 1917.
 Lehrbuch der Kriegs-chirurgie, (with Viktor Schmieden), 1917 – Textbook of war surgery.
 Die deutsche Chirurgie im Weltkrieg 1914 bis 1918, (with Viktor Schmieden), 1920 – German surgery during the War Years 1914–1918.
 Lehrbuch der Chirurgie (with Carl Garré), 1920 – Textbook of surgery.

References 

1864 births
1940 deaths
German surgeons
People from Lippe
People from Lemgo
Academic staff of the Humboldt University of Berlin
University of Jena alumni